William, Willie, Willy, Billy or Bill Hutchinson may refer to:

Politics and law 
 Asa Hutchinson (born 1950), full name William Asa Hutchinson, 46th governor of Arkansas
 William Hutchinson (Rhode Island judge) (1586–1641), merchant, judge, co-founder of Portsmouth, Rhode Island, and husband of Anne Hutchinson
 William Hutchinson (topographer) (1732–1814), English lawyer and antiquary
 William Alston Hutchinson (1839–1897), Australian politician
 William Easton Hutchinson (1860–1952), Associate Justice of the Kansas Supreme Court
 William Hutchinson (Victorian politician) (1864–1924), member of the Victorian Legislative Assembly, 1902–1920
 William Harold Hutchinson (1870s–1965), British trade unionist and Labour Party activist
 William Hutchinson (Australian politician) (1904–1967), member of the Australian House of Representatives, 1931–1949
 William D. Hutchinson (1932–1995), U.S. federal judge
 Billy Hutchinson (born 1955), Northern Irish politician
 Bill Hutchinson (politician), Canadian politician

Sports

Association football
 Billy Hutchinson (footballer, born 1870) (1870–1943), English footballer for Stoke
 William Hutchinson (footballer), (active 1900s), English footballer
 Billy Hutchinson (1930s footballer) (active 1930s), English footballer for Bournemouth, Darlington, Halifax

Rugby
 William Hutchinson (rugby) (William Henry Heap Hutchinson, 1849–1929), English rugby union footballer who played in the 1870s
 William Hutchinson (rugby union) (William Charles Hutchinson, 1856–1880), English rugby union footballer who played in the 1870s
 Billy Hutchinson (rugby league) (1913–1994), English rugby league footballer who played in the 1930s and 1940s

Other sports
 Bill Hutchinson (baseball) (1859–1926), baseball player
 William Hutchinson (bowls) (born 1877), Canadian international lawn bowls player
 Bill Hutchinson (American football) (1916–2008), American football quarterback
 Willie Hutchinson (1921–1992), American baseball player
 Willy Hutchinson (born 1998), Scottish boxer

Other 
 William Hutchinson (archdeacon of Cornwall) (16th–17th c.)
 William Hutchinson (archdeacon of Lewes) from 1628 to 1644
 William Hutchinson (privateer) (1716–1801), worked on tides for Liverpool
 William Hutchinson (superintendent) (1772–1846), convict, emancipist, superintendent of the convict settlement at Norfolk Island
 William Nelson Hutchinson (1803–1895), British general
 William Kinsey Hutchinson (1896–1958), American reporter
 William B. Hutchinson (1909–1997), American surgeon and founder of the Fred Hutchinson Cancer Research Center
 William Y. Hutchinson (1916–2006), American philanthropist
 William Hutchinson (art director) (fl. 1937–1976), art director
 William "Billy" Hutchinson (1959–2007), American firefighter killed in the line of duty in the Charleston Sofa Super Store fire

See also
 William Hutchison (disambiguation)
 William Hutcheson (1874–1953), unionist
 "The Lottery" by Shirley Jackson features a character named Bill Hutchinson